Lingonberry jam is a staple of Northern European cuisine and otherwise highly popular in Central and Eastern Europe. Lingonberries (Vaccinium vitis-idaea) grow on a short evergreen shrub in the Arctic tundra throughout the Northern Hemisphere from Eurasia to North America.

History

In Sweden, lingonberries may be sold as jam and juice, and as a key ingredient in dishes and desserts. Lingonberry jam may be served with meat courses, such as meatballs, beef stew or liver dishes (such as maksalaatikko); regionally, it is served with fried herring. Traditional dishes such as kroppkakor, pitepalt, potato pancakes, spinach pancakes, kåldolmar, fläskpannkaka, mustamakkara and black pudding are also commonly combined with lingonberries. The jam can also be paired with oatmeal porridge (sometimes together with cinnamon), mashed potatoes and some desserts.

Composition
Fine lingonberry jam is prepared with berries, sugar and, optionally, a small amount of water. Cheaper varieties can be diluted with apples. Sweetened lingonberries  (rårörda lingon) or (rørte tyttebær) is prepared fresh by just mixing berries and sugar, without boiling. Because of the benzoic acid, which is found in high amounts in lingonberries, the berries keep well without any preservatives.

See also
 List of spreads

References

External links
Lingonberry Jam (Nordicdiner)
Jams and jellies
Swedish cuisine
Norwegian cuisine
Danish cuisine
Finnish cuisine
Sámi cuisine
Estonian cuisine
Latvian cuisine
Lithuanian cuisine